Cathay is an alternative historical name for China. It may also refer to:

Places:
 Cathay, California, former name of Catheys Valley, California
 Cathay, North Dakota, United States
 Cathays, a district of Cardiff, the capital of Wales
 , a historical landmark movie theatre in Shanghai

In media:
 Cathay (poetry collection), a book of poems by Ezra Pound
 Cathay (Warhammer), a fictional nation in Games Workshop's Warhammer Fantasy universe

Other:
 Cathay Bank, a Chinese-American bank
 Cathay de Grande, a nightclub
 Cathay Pacific, the largest airline and flag carrier of Hong Kong
 Cathay United Bank, a Taiwanese financial services company
 Cathay Life Insurance, a Taiwanese insurance company
 Cathay Organisation, a Singapore-Hong Kong film company
 The Cathay, a mixed-use 17-storey cinema, shopping mall and apartment building
 SS Cathay,  a number of ships
 Cathay Williams, American soldier

See also
 Guotai (disambiguation)